Bringing Home the Bacon may refer to:
 "Bringing Home the Bacon", a song by Procol Harum
 "Bringing Home the Bacon", a 2003 episode of George Lopez
 "Bringing Home the Beacon", a 2003 episode of Farscape
 A colloquial term for earmarking

See also
 Flitch of bacon custom
 Pork barrel